RAS p21 protein activator 1 or RasGAP (Ras GTPase activating protein), also known as RASA1, is a 120-kDa cytosolic human protein that provides two principal activities:
 Inactivation of Ras from its active GTP-bound form to its inactive GDP-bound form by enhancing the endogenous GTPase activity of Ras, via its C-terminal GAP domain
 Mitogenic signal transmission towards downstream interacting partners through its N-terminal SH2-SH3-SH2 domains

The protein encoded by this gene is located in the cytoplasm and is part of the GAP1 family of GTPase-activating proteins. The gene product stimulates the GTPase activity of normal RAS p21 but not its oncogenic counterpart. Acting as a suppressor of RAS function, the protein enhances the weak intrinsic GTPase activity of RAS proteins resulting in the inactive GDP-bound form of RAS, thereby allowing control of cellular proliferation and differentiation. Mutations leading to changes in the binding sites of either protein are associated with basal cell carcinomas. Alternative splicing results in two isoforms where the shorter isoform, lacking the N-terminal hydrophobic region but retaining the same activity, appears to be abundantly expressed in placental but not adult tissues.

Domains
RasGAP contains one SH3 domain and two SH2 domains, a PH domain, a C2 domain, and a GAP domain.

Interactions
RAS p21 protein activator 1 has been shown to interact with:

 ANXA6, 
 CAV2, 
 DNAJA3, 
 DOK1, 
 EPHB2, 
 EPHB3, 
 GNB2L1 
 HCK, 
 HRAS, 
 HTT, 
 IGF1R, 
 KHDRBS1, 
 NCK1,
 PDGFRB, 
 PTK2B, 
 SOCS3,  and
 Src. 

The mRNA can interact with Mir-132 microRNA; this process is linked to angiogenesis.

Disease database
RASA1 gene variant database

References

Further reading

External links
  GeneReviews/NCBI/NIH/UW entry on Capillary Malformation-Arteriovenous Malformation Syndrome and RASA1-Related Parkes Weber Syndrome
  OMIM entries in RASA1 related disorders

Proteins